Bishop Cyril S. Terlecki (Kyrylo Terletsky; , Kiryla Ciarlecki; ; died May 1607) was a religious and political figure and one of the initiators of the conclusion of the Union of Brest in 1596. He served as the Eparch of the Eparchy of Lutsk–Ostroh as both an Eastern Orthodox and Ruthenian Catholic.

Life 

Cyril came from a noble family whose roots were out of Przemysl Land. The members of this family held high ecclesiastical positions in the first half of the 15th century. In the 1560s, he was the archpriest of the church of St. Dmitry in Pinsk. In 1572, the then-Bishop of Turov-Pinsk, Brest, Andrew Rusin, died. In 1575, Terlecki, who at that time was a widower and could accept monastic tonsure, began campaigning to become bishop of the Turov-Pinsk Diocese and, during the interregnum, received a diploma in the Turov-Pinsk diocese. Terlecki supported Prince Konstanty Wasyl Ostrogski, who had land holdings in Pinsk county. After becoming bishop, Terlecki demanded the rights and privileges of the clergy, collected documents from the historical past of his predecessor, and compiled the diocesan archives. Furthermore, he paid special attention to strengthening the economic situation of the church. Around this time, he sponsored the building of the Church of the Holy Spirit in Pinsk and cared for the poor. In 1585, the bishop of Lutsko Ostrozhsky, John-Borzobahatyy Krasenskyy, died, and in May of that year, King Stefan Batory appointed Terlecki his successor. In August 1589, Ecumenical Patriarch Jeremias II appointed Terlecki as Exarch – the first for a Ukrainian bishop.

Church career
 1575 – 1585 – Turov-Pinsk Orthodox bishop
 1585 – 1595 – Lutsk-Ostrog Orthodox bishop
 1596 – 1607 – Lutsk-Ostrog Uniate Bishop

Union

The decline of the Eastern Orthodox Church in the lands of the Commonwealth led Terlecki and other bishops to seek a rapprochement with the Catholic Church. In June 1590, the congress of bishops in Belha, Terlecki, together with other bishops, first raised the issue of the necessity of the Orthodox and Catholic churches. In 1594, at the Congress in the Zocalo, Terlecki instructed to negotiate the conclusion of a future union. In June 1595, members of the Council of Brest agreed on texts of the appeals to the Polish King Sigismund III Vasa and the Pope Clement VIII and decided to send a delegation consisting of Terlecki and Ipatii Potii to Rome. In 1596, Terlecki participated in the Council of Brest, which solemnly proclaimed the ecclesiastical union of the Metropolis of Kyiv and the Roman Catholic Church. In 1598, King Sigismund III Vasa bestowed the title of archimandrite upon him.  Following his death, he was buried at the Cathedral of Lutsk.

Further reading
 Encyclopedia of Ukrainian studies. In 10's t / Gl. yet. Kubiyovych Vladimir . – Paris, New York: Young Life, 1954–1989. 
 History of Ukraine Leonid Gaidai in persons, terms, names and concepts .- Luck: The Tower, 2000. 
 Guide to history in the Ukraine yet. Horseshoe I. and R. Shust .- K.: Genesis, 2001. 
 Ukrainian Soviet encyclopaedic dictionary. – T. 3. – К., 1968.

External links
 Kyrylo Terletsky at Encyclopedia of Ukraine

Converts to Eastern Catholicism from Eastern Orthodoxy
Ukrainian Eastern Catholics
Former Ukrainian Orthodox Christians
Ruthenian nobility of the Polish–Lithuanian Commonwealth
Eastern Orthodox bishops in the Polish–Lithuanian Commonwealth
Bishops of the Uniate Church of the Polish–Lithuanian Commonwealth
1607 deaths
Year of birth unknown
People from Brest Litovsk Voivodeship
Eastern Orthodox bishops of Lutsk